Slupecki or Słupecki is a surname. Notable people with the surname include:

Edward I. Slupecki (1863–?), American politician
Jerzy Słupecki (1904–1987), Polish mathematician and logician

See also
Słupca County